The Sai Kung Peninsula is a peninsula in the easternmost part of the New Territories in Hong Kong. Its name comes from Sai Kung Town in the central southern area of the peninsula. The southern part of the peninsula is administrated by Sai Kung District, the north by Tai Po District and the northwest by Sha Tin District.

Description
The vast land and sea area of the peninsula remains untouched by urbanisation, and it is mostly covered by country parks. The marine ecosystem in Hoi Ha Wan is protected by law. Sai Kung is also a popular place for hiking. The starting point for the  MacLehose Trail is at Pak Tam Chung in Sai Kung.

There are also water sports sites along the shoreline offering kayaking, snorkelling and swimming among other activities. In addition, Sai Kung's Hoi Ha Wan is one of the most easily accessed coral dive sites in Hong Kong. It is suitable for diver training and for newly certified divers.

As a former fishing village, Sai Kung Town is a prime attraction for seafood lovers, locals and tourists alike. Visitors can stroll around the regional market center of Sai Kung Town or explore the back lanes, visit the Tin Hau Temple, feast on seafood or enjoy different delicacies at Western-style pubs and restaurants. There is also a famous dessert restaurant called Honeymoon Dessert that brings in many visitors from all over Hong Kong and even from abroad.

In the northern Sai Kung Peninsula, there is also an area called Wong Shek. There are places where people can barbecue and enjoy the view of the sea. However, to protect the natural environment of Wong Shek, the Government controls the number of vehicle entering the area. There is a gate at Pak Tam Chung on the way towards Wong Shek, only allowing vehicles with permits to go through.

Off the coast of the Sai Kung Peninsula, there are many outlying islands. On summer nights, many people hire small boats known as kai-tos or sampans to have leisurely trips through the island-dotted inland sea of Port Shelter. Popular islands to visit include:

Kau Sai Chau
Sharp Island (Kiu Tsui Chau)
High Island (Leung Shuen Wan Chau)
Pak Sha Chau (lit. white sand island)
Yeung Chau (lit. sheep island)
Yim Tin Tsai (lit. little salt field)

Although Wong Shek and Hoi Ha Wan are geographically in the northern part of Sai Kung Peninsula, they are under the administration of Tai Po District, due to their reliance on ferry transport from Tai Po for access before the construction of Sai Sha Road.

History
From about the 14th century, fishing communities lived on boats in sheltered inlets on the peninsula. They later founded small coastal villages, building temples in honour of Tin Hau and Hung Shing in places of permanent anchorage. In addition to coastal fishing, there were small supporting industries of salt-making and boat building.

Agricultural settlements began later and several villages already existed by the year 1660. Economic development began in the middle of the 19th century when Hong Kong was opened as a port. There was especially a prosperous kiln industry producing lime, bricks and tiles for supply Hong Kong during the early days. Sheung Yiu Village, once opened as a Folk Museum, was a good example of a fortified settlement well known for lime-making in those days.

Until 1970, the part of Sai Kung beyond Tai Mong Tsai was still remote, reachable only on foot or by kai-tos (local ferry). In 1979, the project was completed, providing also two new roads to the area. Since then, the city people can reach this relatively unspoilt area for recreation.

Geology

The Sai Kung Peninsula and the islands near the coast are composed almost entirely of volcanic materials. Coarse tuffs are found in the northern and south-western parts of the Peninsula and Tap Mun area. Pyroclastic rocks with some lava are found in the eastern part of the Sharp Peak and Sham Chung areas. Acid lavas are found in the area surrounding the High Island Reservoir and the south islands such as Kau Sai Chau, Tiu Chung Chau and Basalt Island, banded acid lava with some welded tuffs are found in the central and southern shore of Pak Tam Chung area.

The most spectacular of all are the hexagonal columnar joints which are found near the east dam of the High Island Reservoir and Po Pin Chau area. They are the results of the uniform cooling of tuff. This natural landscape is complemented by the nearby gigantic water works.

Along the south-eastern coast and on the offshore islands that are exposed to the easterly winds and sea waves, interesting landforms such as sea caves, stacks, arches and inlets add to the beauty of the natural landscape.

Vegetation
Grassland generally covers the hilltops, and across the Peninsula, there is an overall gradient from the grassland in the east to the woodland in the west.

Grassland species are predominantly minireed, duck-beak grass and false staghorn fern. Shrubs cloth the lower slopes and species for Melastoma, Rhodomyrtus, Baeckea, Eurya and Gordonia are commonly found.

Natural woodland, often in strips along the valleys or as patches behind villages are rich in native species of Machilus, Litsea, Sapium, Ficus, Sterculia and Schefflera.

Forest plantations, the result of both direct government planting and government-assisted village planting in the 1950s cover the hillslopes, are mostly in the western part of the Peninsula. Chinese red pine was the most important species planted and many of these old pines are now approaching senility and suffer from nematode attack. Fortunately the under-storey native broad-leafed trees are growing up to take their place.

The long and irregular coastline of the Peninsula also presents a wide variety of sea shore conditions for specialised and interesting plant communities to develop.

Wildlife
The grassy hillside of Sai Kung Peninsula have few birds. Around the picnic and barbecue sites, crested mynah and Eurasian tree sparrow may be seen feeding on scraps of left-over food. In patches of shrubs, Chinese bulbul can commonly be seen feeding on berries. In the densely wooded areas species such as greater coucal, great tit and Oriental magpie nest. The old fung shui woods are particularly attractive to winter visitors such as thrushes which migrate to Hong Kong from China. Kingfishers can be found searching for food in streams.

Most large wild animals are nocturnal and are rarely seen but porcupine, pangolin, masked palm civet, leopard cat, wild boar and python have been sighted in the area.

References